1982 FIFA World Cup qualification UEFA Group 7 consisted of three of the 34 teams entered into the European zone: East Germany, Malta, and Poland. These three teams competed on a home-and-away basis for one of the 14 spots in the final tournament allocated to the European zone, with the group's winner claiming that spot.

Standings

Results

Goalscorers

5 goals

 Włodzimierz Smolarek

3 goals

 Joachim Streich

2 goals

 Rüdiger Schnuphase

1 goal

 Reinhard Häfner
 Jürgen Heun
 Andreas Krause
 Emanuel Fabri
 Ernest Spiteri-Gonzi
 Zbigniew Boniek
 Andrzej Buncol
 Dariusz Dziekanowski
 Andrzej Iwan
 Leszek Lipka
 Stefan Majewski
 Andrzej Szarmach

1 own goal

 John Holland (playing against East Germany)

Notes

External links 
Group 7 Detailed Results at RSSSF

7
1980–81 in East German football
1981–82 in East German football
1980–81 in Maltese football
1981–82 in Maltese football
1980–81 in Polish football
1981–82 in Polish football